Hades is a roguelike video game developed and published by Supergiant Games. It was released for macOS, Nintendo Switch, and Windows in September 2020, which followed an early access release in December 2018. It was later released for PlayStation 4, PlayStation 5, Xbox One, and Xbox Series X/S in August 2021.

Players control Zagreus, the son of Hades, as he attempts to escape from the Underworld to reach Mount Olympus, at times aided by gifts bestowed on him from the other Olympians. Each run challenges the player through a random series of rooms populated with enemies and rewards. The game has a hack and slash combat system; the player uses a combination of their main weapon attack, a special attack, a dash ability, and a magic ability to defeat them while avoiding damage to progress as far as possible. While Zagreus will often die, the player can use gained treasure to improve certain attributes or unlock new weapons and abilities to improve chances of escaping on subsequent runs.

Hades was developed following Supergiant's Pyre, a game in which they wanted to explore procedural narrative storytelling, but due to the nature of the main gameplay, found that players did not play through Pyre multiple times to explore this. The roguelike structure of Hades gave them the opportunity to tell these branching stories to the player over the course of multiple runs.

A commercial and critical success, Hades received universal acclaim for its gameplay, art direction, music, narrative and characters and sold over one million copies. It is considered to be one of the best video games of 2020, and was named game of the year from several award ceremonies and media publications. A sequel, Hades II, was announced in 2022.

Gameplay 

The player takes the role of Zagreus, the prince of the Underworld, who is trying to escape the realm to get away from his unloving father, Hades, and reach his mother Persephone in the mortal world. His quest is supported by the other Olympians, who grant him gifts to help fight the beings that protect the exit from the Underworld. He is also helped on his quest by notorious residents of the Underworld, such as Sisyphus, Eurydice, or Patroclus. The game world is divided between four main dungeons, each representing one of the regions of the Underworld, namely Tartarus, Asphodel, Elysium, and the Temple of Styx, with each new region being unlocked upon clearing the previous locale.

The game is presented in an isometric view with the player in control of Zagreus. The player starts a run-through of the game by trying to fight their way through a number of rooms; the rooms are drawn from a pool of pre-determined layouts, but their order and the enemies that appear are randomly determined. The game has a hack and slash combat system. The player has a primary attack and a secondary "special" attack depending on their pre-determined weapon of choice (out of 6), a magic "cast" that can be used from long range, a dash providing momentary intangibility and mobility which can deal damage when combined with an attack or boon, and a summon attack that can call tremendous power from one of the Gods. Throughout a run, the Olympians will provide Boons, each of which provides a choice of three persistent boosts and effects for that run that the player can select from. The Boons are themed based on the Olympian; for example, Zeus's boons provide lightning damage effects and Poseidon's provide push-back wave effects.

The player will move through rooms to gradually climb up the Underworld; after clearing a room, the player will be given the room's rewards, allowing them to grow stronger or recover lost health points as Zagreus moves closer and closer to his ultimate goal, however should Zagreus' health points drop to zero while he has no "death defiance" tokens left he is defeated and taken by the river Styx back to the House of Hades, which effectively acts as the game's overworld between attempts. Hades features a combination of roguelike and dungeon-crawler elements, where obols and certain types of upgrades are lost upon death and must be collected anew each time, while other types of currency can be used at the House to purchase permanent upgrades that affect all future attempts. After clearing a certain number of rooms in a region, the player will have to fight the bosses of the region to advance to the next, namely, one of the three Furies in Tartarus, the skeletonized Lernaean Hydra in Asphodel, Theseus and Asterius in Elysium, and Hades himself at the very gates of the Underworld.

Between runs, Zagreus can explore the House of Hades before setting on a new escape attempt. Here, the player can use items recovered from run-throughs to impact the meta-game. The player can unlock and upgrade abilities for Zagreus, order construction of new Underworld features that may appear in future run-throughs, or obtain or upgrade new weapons. They can also have Zagreus interact with the various characters of the Underworld and improve his standing with them, which provide narrative elements to the game and may also provide quests with additional rewards. The player also has the option to romance some NPCs as the plot progresses.

As the game progresses, the players can manually customize and increase the difficulty of the gameplay by using the Pact of Punishment, which allow the player to add extra challenges or modify some aspects of the game. For example, the Pact can increase the attack power, health or the number of enemies on the run; it can even drastically change part of the gameplay by changing the boss fights, like allowing Theseus to use a machine-gun-mounted chariot or adding an extra phase in Hades' boss fight. By continuously increasing the difficulty, the player can continue to receive rare rewards after the runs, unlock some special decorative items back at the House, and progress certain NPC subplots.

Alternatively, the player can activate a setting called God Mode. This setting makes the player character stronger after every failed run through the Underworld. This means players having difficulty with the game can progress more easily and experience the full story of the game.

Plot 
Zagreus (Darren Korb), the son of Hades (Logan Cunningham), seeks to escape his father's realm in the Underworld. He is aided by his adoptive mother Nyx (Jamie Landrum), the Gods of Olympus to whom he has reached out,  and many other inhabitants of the Underworld. Hades claims that no escape is possible, and hinders Zagreus by unleashing the Underworld's monsters on him. As soon as Zagreus is slain, he is revived at the House of Hades at the bottom of the Underworld, which he leaves to begin another escape attempt.

It is eventually revealed that Zagreus wishes to escape the Underworld to find Persephone (Laila Berzins), his birth mother whom he never knew, having always been told he was the child of Nyx. Hades refuses to even allow her name to be spoken in his House and it is said that unimaginable punishment should befall anyone who disobeys his order. Nyx decides to help Zagreus find the truth about his birth mother by putting him in contact with his relatives on Olympus. After reaching the exit to the Underworld and defeating Hades, Zagreus finds Persephone at a cottage in Greece. After a tearful reunion, Zagreus discovers that since he is bound to the Underworld like his father, he will quickly die after reaching the surface. Despite this, he promises to keep escaping the Underworld to spend time with Persephone and learn the truth of her absence.

Over the course of these visits, it is revealed that Hades was "given" Persephone by Zeus (Peter Canavese) as a reward for ruling over the Underworld, with the other Olympians believing that she simply disappeared. The two had a loving marriage, until Zagreus was stillborn due to the Fates having decreed that Hades would never have an heir. Persephone ran away in grief, but refused to return to her birthplace on Olympus, which she disliked due to the constant bickering of the Olympians. Zagreus was eventually brought back to life by Nyx after she made a deal with the Fates. Persephone refuses to return to the Underworld because she fears retribution towards Hades if the Olympians discover the truth about her disappearance. Zagreus eventually convinces her to return by reminding her of the bonds of family, and they are ferried to the House of Hades by Charon (Logan Cunningham). Persephone resumes her duties as Queen of the Underworld and Hades, now with a renewed respect for his son, allows Zagreus to continue his escape attempts under the guise of finding security vulnerabilities in the Underworld.

In an epilogue, Persephone tells Zagreus of her idea of reconciling with the Olympians by inviting them all to a feast in the House. At the feast, they claim that Hades and Persephone eloped and had Zagreus, while saying that due to her having eaten Underworld pomegranate seeds, she can only leave the Underworld a few months out of the year. The Olympians readily accept this explanation, though it is implied they know the truth and simply wish to move on. With everyone reconciled, Zagreus' duties to escape his home continue.

Development 
Following the release of their previous game, Pyre, Supergiant Games was interested in developing a game that would help to open up their development process to players, so that they would end up making the best game they possibly could from player feedback. They recognized that this would not only help with the gameplay approach but also with narrative elements, and thus opted to use the early access approach in developing Hades once they had established the foundation of the game. As Supergiant was still a small team of about 20 employees, they knew they could only support early access across one platform, with the intent to then port to other platforms near the completion of the game. Supergiant had spoken to Epic Games and learned of their intent to launch their own Epic Games Store, and felt the experimental platform was an appropriate match with Hades. Supergiant's decision was made in part due to Epic's focus on content creators, as Supergiant had developed Hades in mind to be a game favorable to streamers, which would be benefited through the Epic Games Store. Supergiant anticipated that Hades would take about three years to complete, comparable to the development time of their previous titles.

In terms of the game's narrative and approach, the Supergiant team had discussed what type of game they wanted to make next, and settled on a concept that would be easy to pick up and play, which could be played in very short periods, and had opportunities for expanding on after release, driving them towards a roguelike game, which have generally best utilized the early access approach. The roguelike approach also fit well with their past gameplay design goals, where they aimed to continue to add in new tricks or tools for the player that would make them reconsider how they have been playing the game to that point. Pyre had been an attempt to create a branching open-ended narrative, but once the game was released, Supergiant recognized that most players would only play through the game once and thus lose out on the branching narrative perspective. With Hades established as a roguelike, the team felt the branching narrative approach would be much more appropriate since the genre calls for players to repeatedly play through the game.

For the setting, Supergiant considered revisiting the worlds from their previous games but felt a wholly new setting would be better. Supergiant's creative director Greg Kasavin came onto the idea of Greek mythology, a topic he had been interested in since his youth.  Originally, it was planned to name the game Minos, with the hero Theseus as the player-character seeking an exit from the ever-shifting mazes of Minos. The mazes readily supported the roguelike facets but Supergiant found it difficult to incorporate the branching narrative factors. They also found that Theseus was too generic of a character to fit their narrative.

During a work break, Kasavin researched more into Greek myths and found that Hades was underrepresented in these stories, as the Olympians feared him. This discovery led Kasavin towards having the game centered on Zagreus attempting to escape from Hades and the Underworld as a more interesting narrative approach. Kasavin compared the gods as "a big dysfunctional family that we can see ourselves in", and that by having Zagreus repeatedly try and fail to escape from Hades, it would provide both the type of slapstick comedy that he felt captured the relationships in this "family", as well as the player experience typically associated with roguelikes where one moment the player may feel invincible only to be quickly defeated and brought back to the start the next moment. The change from Theseus to Zagreus had minimal impact on the game content they had developed to that point, and helped in establishing the gameplay connection to the narrative; Theseus remained in the game but his role became that of a boss character, transforming him to a boastful villain along with a tag-team partner of Asterius the minotaur. The Greek God narrative also informs the benefits that the player obtains as they progress through the game, representing the different powers of the gods, and various gameplay elements such as Trials of the Gods, emphasizing the fickle relationship the gods had with each other. These bits of dialog are advanced with each run through the game, thus making each attempt to escape meaningful compared to traditional roguelikes, which Supergiant felt would help draw more players into the game.

In contrast to Bastion and Transistor, which were more linear games and thus had more control over how the player progressed, Hades presented the challenge of writing dialog for the multitude of routes the player could progress in the game. Kasavin and his writers drafted out about ten hours' worth of dialog between Zagreus and the non-player characters based on a large number of potential chained events that could happen to the player. For example, while in a run, the player may encounter Eurydice, and on return to the main hub after failing the run, meet Eurydice's husband Orpheus, who, because of that prior meeting, asks the player to deliver a message to Eurydice the next time they encounter her. These dialog events also tied into improvements at the hub once the player saw through the chain of events.

Supergiant remained committed to honoring the Greek mythology throughout the game. The game's art, primarily by in-house artist Jen Zee, show all of the Olympians as attractive with tasteful homage to the "heroic nudity" of ancient Greek art, according to Kasavin. The game also explores the diverse sexuality that was implied by the Greek myths; Zagreus is bisexual and in certain routes polyamorous, while one side narrative explores the gay relationship between Achilles and Patroclus.

During the development process of Hades, Supergiant decided to rewrite their custom game engine to provide better game performance and better cross platform support. Their original engine, which was written in C# and used the Microsoft XNA framework, had been used by the studio for all of their games since Bastion. While making Hades, due the technical limitations and difficulties of hardware porting and other performance aspects, Supergiant decided to rewrite their engine using C++ based on the framework The Forge to benefit from the increased performance that native code provides.

Release 
Hades was announced at The Game Awards 2018 on December 6, 2018, and confirmed as one of the first third-party titles to be offered on the newly-announced Epic Games Store. According to Geoff Keighley, the host and organizer of the Game Awards show, Supergiant's Amir Rao and Greg Kasavin approached him at the 2018 D.I.C.E. Summit in February about Hades and their intention to release it as an early access title on the same day of the Game Awards. Hades was a timed-exclusive on the Epic Games Store, later releasing for Steam on December 10, 2019. Supergiant officially released the game out of early access on September 17, 2020, coinciding with the release on the Nintendo Switch platform. Though cross-save between the Windows and Switch version had been planned at that point, Supergiant had to put this off until a patch that was released in December 2020, with crosssaving enabled through the Epic Games Store account platform.

A physical Nintendo Switch release of Hades was released on March 19, 2021. Ports for PlayStation 4, PlayStation 5, Xbox One, and Xbox Series X/S were released on August 13, 2021.

Reception 

Hades received "universal acclaim", according to review aggregator Metacritic. Critics praised Hades for its story, characters, gameplay and soundtrack. IGN praised the characters, writing that they each "[felt] like an authentic reinterpretation of a classic Greek myth...they're all a joy to behold." The Guardian liked art director Jen Zee's work on the game, particularly her portraits of the characters, calling them "wonderfully drawn" and  "with appropriate godlike profiles." Jordan Devore of Destructoid enjoyed the story, feeling the dialogue made use of its non-linear nature "without coming across as artificial or "game-y"". Game Informers Matt Miller felt that "the combat is fast-paced and challenging" and there was variety in the enemies Zagreus would face, although Miller thought that the combat could rely on button mashing at certain points. Suriel Vazquez, writing for GameSpot felt that the worldbuilding complimented "a robust postgame that... offers even more reasons to play an already entrancing mix of RPG and action combat".

During its nearly two-year long early access period, Hades sold 700,000 copies. Within three days of its official release, it sold an additional 300,000 copies for a sales total of over one million.

Awards 
Hades won several awards and honors. At the 10th Annual New York Game Awards, it won in the Game of the Year, Best Music, Best Writing, and Best Acting categories. Several publications considered it one of the best video games of 2020, including Polygon, Giant Bomb, IGN, USGamer, Destructoid, Time, The Washington Post, Slant Magazine, and Entertainment Weekly. It won Game of the Year at the 2021 British Academy Games Awards, the 24th Annual D.I.C.E. Awards, Gayming Awards, 21st Game Developers Choice Awards and the inaugural Global Industry Game Awards. Hades also was the first game to be awarded a Hugo Award as part of a special video games category introduced for the 2021 Hugo Awards, as well as a Nebula Award for its writing.

Sequel

A sequel, Hades II, was announced at The Game Awards 2022. The protagonist of the sequel is Melinoë, the Princess of the Underworld and sister to Zagreus, who seeks to defeat Cronus, the Titan of Time, with the aid of the goddess of witchcraft Hecate and other Olympian gods and figures. The game will first be released on Windows in early access, similar to the first game's original release, with plans to port the game to consoles.

Notes

References

External links 
 

2020 video games
AIAS Game of the Year winners
British Academy Games Award for Best Game winners
British Academy Games Award for Game Design winners
D.I.C.E. Award for Action Game of the Year winners
Dungeon crawler video games
Early access video games
The Game Awards winners
Game Developers Choice Award for Game of the Year winners
Golden Joystick Award winners
Greek and Roman deities in fiction
Greek underworld in popular culture
Hugo Award-winning works
LGBT-related video games
Nebula Award for Best Game Writing-winning works
MacOS games
Nintendo Switch games
PlayStation 4 games
PlayStation 5 games
Private Division games
Roguelike video games
Single-player video games
Take-Two Interactive games
Video games based on Greek mythology
Video games developed in the United States
Video games scored by Darren Korb
Windows games
Xbox One games
Xbox Series X and Series S games